Versailles Township may refer to the following places in the United States:

Versailles Township, Allegheny County, Pennsylvania
Versailles Township, Brown County, Illinois

See also
 Versailles (disambiguation)

Township name disambiguation pages